The Maya Rata (Principality of), also known as the Kingdom of Dakkinadesa, was a principality or an administrative region of the
Sinhalese kingdom. It was located in the Southwestern part of Sri Lanka, bordered the Deduru Oya. Its last capital was Parakramapura. The principality was disbanded following the formation of the 
second kingdom of Polonnaruwa by Parakramabahu I.

History 
Being heirless has provided royalty with a thorny problem throughout history. It happened with Sri Lanka's first king, Vijaya, the legendary founder of the Sinhalese race. Having no progeny, he named as his successor his younger brother, Prince Sumitra. However, Sumitra was growing old so he offered the new kingdom in Sri Lanka to his sons, the youngest of whom, Prince Panduwas Deva, consented. Unfortunately, Vijaya died before his successor landed in Lanka, and a year's interregnum ensued in which the prime minister, Upatissa, assumed monarchical power.

Panduwas Deva was eventually crowned king and ruled the country between 504BCE and 474BCE. Not surprisingly, legend suggests that Panduwas Nuwara (Panduwas’ City. In the Sri Lankan lingo it is known both as ‘Panduwas Nuwara’ and ‘Panduwasnuwara’) was Panduwas Dev's capital. But in the 12th Century, it became the first capital of King Parakramabahu, who ruled Dakkinadesa (South Country), one of the three discrete kingdoms into which the Island was divided. Later, he unified the whole Island and became the revered king, ‘Parakramabahu the Great’ (1153–1186AD), who oversaw the expansion of his major capital, Polonnaruwa, and constructed vast irrigation works.

Having established Panduwas Nuwara as the capital of Dakkinadesa, Parakramabahu began to experiment architecturally. This experience no doubt assisted him later when he commenced his grand building schemes at Polonnaruwa. Furthermore, he established a military base and raised a formidable army. So it is Parakramabahu's legacy, not Panduwas Deva's, which is most evident at Panduwas Nuwara today.
As the Successor of his uncle king Kirti Sri Megha

Panduwas Nuwara is located halfway—35 km—between Kurunegala and Chilaw. The site covers an area of 20 hectares and entrance is free. It is more accessible by public transport than many other remote archaeological sites, for buses run regularly from Kurunegala to Chilaw and stop at the village of Panduwas Nuwara.

The ruins provide an excellent example of the layout and ground plan of a Sinhalese royal palace of the period—originally painted white outside, and red inside—complete with meda midula (inner courtyard), and fortifications. At the centre of the ruined city lies the citadel, which possesses just one east-facing gateway. The thick walls of the citadel are protected by a non-functional moat.

An inner area, measuring some 400m by 375m, contains several interesting archaeological remains. The courtyard of the palace is enclosed by galleries and a central structure, reached by stone steps, to the left of which can be seen an asana (stone seat). An inscription in the first room on the south side relates that King Nissanka Malla (1187-1196AD), who succeeded Parakramabahu, visited this spot to witness dance performances in the decade following Parakramabahu's death.

Facing the sole gateway is the two-storeyed palace that consists of a central building with solid brick walls and a surrounding gallery. This palace is reminiscent of the one built later by Parakramabahu at Polonnaruwa. The remains indicate that wooden pillars once adorned this hall: ancient architecture was not stone but timber-based. It is believed that more than 150 wooden pillars were embedded in stone to provide support for the upper storey of the palace.

During the 12th Century, Panduwas Nuwara housed the Sacred Tooth Relic, which was brought back to Sri Lanka from India by Parakramabahu. Consequently, one of the primary features of the site is the restored Dalada Maligawa (Temple of the Tooth). There is a beautiful bodhigara (enclosure constructed around bo-trees) and a pilimage (image-house); also a vihara with a beautiful lotus petal motif. A royal edict recording grants of edifices for religious purposes, inscribed on a pillar in Tamil, is situated close by.

Farther along are the remains of an ektemge (circular tower) surrounded by a circular moat. There are differing stories that attempt to explain the reasons behind the construction of this tower. Panduwas Deva had a daughter, Princess Unmada Chitra. One story claims that the princess was confined to the ektemge to keep her distanced from prospective suitors due to prophecies that if she bore a son, he would kill his uncles and take the throne.

However, Handbook for the Ceylon Traveller pursues a different, more esoteric, track: “A most interesting location is a circular earthwork, a rampart, sited in a shady grove of trees. Within this rampart are the ruins of a building. Evidence supports the theory that a miniature universe is represented here, where King Parakramabahu was installed in the centre as Lord of the Universe.”

The author provides no references or argument to support such a claim, but I suspect the theory originated with Professor Senerath Paranavitana, former Archaeological Commissioner of Ceylon. Paranavitana had a brilliant mind and contributed many publications to the subject of archaeology, but towards the end of his life, his imagination seems to have gotten the better of him.

At the entrance to the site, there's a modest museum, which displays some interesting finds from various excavations, including a small bronze statue with a rope in its hands, bearing a remarkable resemblance to the immense figure, supposed to be that of Parakramabahu, close to Potgul Vihara at Polonnaruwa, whose hands hold some unidentified object believed to represent the yoke of kingship.

See also
 History of Sri Lanka
 List of Maya Rata monarchs
 List of monarchs of Sri Lanka

References

Anuradhapura period
Former monarchies of South Asia
Former countries in South Asia